The Shahi Masjid, also known as masjid awan e shahi , Public garden Mosque and Bagh E Aam ke Masjid, is a mosque within the Public Gardens, Hyderabad adjacent to Telangana Legislative Assembly, Hyderabad, India. In 1924 the Nizam of Hyderabad Mir Osman Ali Khan commissioned the construction of the Shahi Masjid thru "the City Improvement Board" and was constructed completed in 1933. The mosque served as a principal mosque for the VII Nizam and his courtiers.

See also
 List of former mosques in Spain
 Heritage Structures of Hyderabad
 Toli Masjid

References

Mosques in Hyderabad, India